Kratovo may refer to:
Kratovo, North Macedonia, a town
Kratovo Municipality, North Macedonia, which contains the town
Kratovo, Russia, an urban locality in Moscow Oblast, Russia
Kratovo (Priboj), a village in Serbia